Steven Kitshoff (born 10 February 1992) is a South African rugby union rugby player. His playing position is loosehead prop.

Kitshoff was a member of the South Africa Under 20 team that won the 2012 IRB Junior World Championship. In addition, Kitshoff was part of the Western Province team that won the 2012 Currie Cup.

Kitshoff attended Hendrik Louw Primary School and Paul Roos Gymnasium.

Career

Western Province and Stormers

Kitshoff first broke through during the 2011 season, making 5 substitute appearances for the Stormers and then 5 Currie Cup appearances for Western Province while still only a teenager.

Bordeaux

In February 2015, it was revealed that Kitshoff would join French Top 14 side  at the conclusion of the 2015 Currie Cup Premier Division season.

International rugby

On 28 May 2016, Kitshoff was included in a 31-man  squad for their three-test match series against a touring  team.

Kitshoff was named in South Africa's squad for the 2019 Rugby World Cup. South Africa went on to win the tournament, defeating England in the final.

Springbok statistics

Test Match Record

Pld = Games Played, W = Games Won, D = Games Drawn, L = Games Lost, Tri = Tries Scored, Pts = Points Scored

Super Rugby statistics

References

External links
 
 

Living people
1992 births
South African rugby union players
Stormers players
Western Province (rugby union) players
Afrikaner people
People from Somerset West
Rugby union props
South Africa Under-20 international rugby union players
South Africa international rugby union players
Union Bordeaux Bègles players
Rugby union players from the Western Cape